The men's 200 metres was an event at the 1928 Summer Olympics in Amsterdam. It was held on 31 July and 1 August 1928 at the Olympic Stadium. There were 59 competitors from 29 nations. Nations had been limited to 4 athletes each since 1920. The event was won by Percy Williams of Canada, the nation's second victory in the event (after 1908). The win broke a streak of three victories by the United States; with no Americans on the podium, the nation's six-Games medal streak was broken as well. Walter Rangeley of Great Britain took silver, giving Great Britain a four-Games medal streak in the event. Germany earned its first men's 200 metres medal with Helmut Körnig's bronze.

Background

This was the seventh appearance of the event, which was not held at the first Olympics in 1896 but has been on the program ever since. Two of the six finalists from the 1924 Games returned: gold medalist Jackson Scholz and two-time silver medalist Charley Paddock, both of the United States. Scholz was a slight favorite, but the Americans had not won any medals in the 100 metres earlier in Amsterdam and the winner of that event, Canada's Percy Williams, was a strong contender for a double in this event.

Lithuania and Romania each made their debut in the event. The United States made its seventh appearance, the only nation to have competed at each edition of the 200 metres to date.

Competition format

The competition used the four round format introduced in 1920: heats, quarterfinals, semifinals, and a final. There were 15 heats of between 2 and 6 runners each, with the top 2 men in each advancing to the quarterfinals. The quarterfinals consisted of 6 heats of 5 athletes each; the two fastest men in each heat advanced to the semifinals. There were 2 semifinals, each with 6 runners. In that round, the top three athletes advanced. The final had 6 runners. The races were run on a now-standard 400 metre track.

Records

Prior to this competition, the existing world and Olympic records were as follows:

No new world or Olympic records were set during the competition. Helmut Körnig  tied the Olympic record in the last quarterfinal.

Schedule

Results

Heats

15 heats were held; the fastest two in each heat advanced to Round Two.

Heat 1

Heat 2

Heat 3

Heat 4

Heat 5

Heat 6

Heat 7

Heat 8

Heat 9

Heat 10

Heat 11

Heat 12

Heat 13

Heat 14

Heat 15

Quarterfinals

Six heats were held; the fastest two finishers in each heat advanced to the semi-finals.

Quarterfinal 1

Quarterfinal 2

Quarterfinal 3

Quarterfinal 4

Quarterfinal 5

Quarterfinal 6

Semifinals

The fastest three runners from each of the two heats advanced to the Final Round.

Semifinal 1

Semifinal 2

Final

Williams beat Rangley by a yard to complete his 100/200 double, while Rangley finished six inches ahead of Körnig and Scholz.

Körnig and Scholz finished so close that the judges declared the men had dead-heated, and ordered a run-off. As Scholz declined to participate, Körnig was awarded the bronze medal: in the event, the film of the race confirms that Körnig finished third.

References

External links
 Official Report
 Results

2
200 metres at the Olympics
Men's events at the 1928 Summer Olympics